David Warholm (26 November 1888 – 29 July 1971) was a Swedish fencer. He competed in the individual and team épée events at the 1920 Summer Olympics.

References

External links
 

1888 births
1971 deaths
Swedish male épée fencers
Olympic fencers of Sweden
Fencers at the 1920 Summer Olympics
People from Lysekil Municipality
Sportspeople from Västra Götaland County
20th-century Swedish people